An Evening with Jill Scott is a concert tour by American recording artist, Jill Scott. Beginning in October 2011, the tour supported the singer's fourth studio album, The Light of the Sun. The tour mainly consisted of Scott performing at various music festivals in Europe and North America. For the first time ever, Jill Scott will also tour Australia in 2013. Shows in Europe were known as: Jill Scott: Live in Europe.

Opening acts
Anthony Hamilton (Tuscaloosa)
DJ Semtex (London—November 30)
D'Angelo (Juan-les-Pins)
Jones Jnr (Australia)

Setlist
"Shame"
"Hate on Me"
"The Way"
"Quick"
"The Real Thing"
"So In Love"
"Le BOOM Vent Suite"
"Slowly Surely"
"It's Love"
"Womanifesto
"Rolling Hills"
"Come See Me"
"Cross My Mind"
"So Gone (What My Mind Says)"
"Crown Royal"
"A Long Walk"
"Golden"
Encore
"When I Wake Up"
"He Loves Me (Lyzel In E Flat)"
"Blessed"

Tour dates

Festivals and other miscellaneous performances
This concert was a part of "Bayfest"
This concert was a part of the "ASU Homecoming"
This concert was a part of "Jazz in the Gardens"
This concert is a part of the "Hampton Jazz Festival"
This concert is a part of the "North Sea Jazz Festival"
This concert is a part of the "Somerset House Summer Series"

Cancellations and rescheduled shows

Box office score data

External links
Scott's Official Website

References

Jill Scott (singer) concert tours
2011 concert tours
2012 concert tours